The Crane Group of four 200 ton small galleons were built after the defeat of the Spanish Armada in 1588. These vessels were all armed with about 20 guns and were rated in the six tier rating system of 1626 as Fourth Rate ships. They were all gone by the 1630s.

Design and specifications
The ships may have been built in Deptford but not much information survives. The master shipwrights are known but not the exact location of their builds. Only launch years are available for each ship. The dimensions of the vessels is varied and will be shown on the individual pages of each vessel. The gun armaments was also varied though it is known that they carried around nineteen to twenty guns of demi-culverins, sakers, minions and fowlers.

Ships of the Crane Group

Citations

References
 British Warships in the Age of Sail (1603 – 1714), by Rif Winfield, published by Seaforth Publishing, England © Rif Winfield 2009, EPUB , Chapter 4, The Fourth Rates - 'Small Ships', Vessels in service or on order at 24 March 1603, Crane Group
 Colledge, Ships of the Royal Navy, by J.J. Colledge, revised and updated by Lt-Cdr Ben Warlow and Steve Bush, published by Seaforth Publishing, Barnsley, Great Britain, © the estate of J.J. Colledge, Ben Warlow and Steve Bush 2020, EPUB 

 

Ships of the Royal Navy
16th-century ships